The following is a list of notable earthquakes and tsunamis which had their epicenter in areas that are now part of the United States with the latter affecting areas of the United States.  Those in italics were not part of the United States when the event occurred.

List of earthquakes

Earthquake swarms which affected the United States:
 1962–71 Denver earthquake swarm
 Enola earthquake swarm
 2008 Reno earthquakes
 Guy-Greenbrier earthquake swarm
 Oklahoma earthquake swarms (2009–present)

Earthquakes which affected the United States but whose epicenters were outside the United States borders:
 1925 Charlevoix–Kamouraska earthquake – magnitude 6.2 earthquake, no injuries or fatalities anywhere
 1979 Imperial Valley earthquake – magnitude 6.4 earthquake with an epicenter less than 1 km inside Mexico – significant damage and injuries on both sides of the border (60 in the US)
 2010 Baja California earthquake (Mexico near S California) – magnitude 7.2 earthquake, 4 fatalities and 100 injuries, none in the United States

Earthquakes which did not affect the United States directly, but caused tsunamis which did:
 1960 Valdivia earthquake and tsunami – magnitude 9.5 earthquake, between 2200 and 6000 fatalities, including 61 in Hilo, HI
 2006 Kuril Islands earthquake and tsunami – magnitude 8.3 earthquake, no injuries or fatalities anywhere
 2010 Chile earthquake and tsunami – magnitude 8.8 earthquake, ~525 fatalities and unknown number of injuries, none in the United States
 2011 Tohoku earthquake and tsunami – magnitude 9.0 earthquake, 15,850–28,000 fatalities and 6,011 injured, one fatality and unknown number of injuries in the United States
 2012 Haida Gwaii earthquake – magnitude 7.8 earthquake with an epicenter on Moresby Island in British Columbia, the second largest Canadian earthquake ever recorded by a seismometer, over 100,000 people were evacuated to higher ground in the state of Hawai'i

List of strongest earthquakes by states and territories 
 Noted, magnitudes are reported on the Moment magnitude scale (Mw).

See also

 Geology of North America
 Geology of the United States
 List of historical tsunamis
 Lists of earthquakes
 List of earthquakes in Canada
 List of earthquakes in Alaska
 List of earthquakes in California
 List of earthquakes in Kansas
 List of earthquakes in Nevada
 List of earthquakes in Puerto Rico
 List of earthquakes in Texas
 List of earthquakes in Utah

References

External links
 List of historic U.S. earthquakes at the United States Geological Survey
 Earthquake data at the National Geophysical Data Center
 

 List of earthquakes in the United States
United States
Earthquakes
Earthquakes
 List